The South African Hypnosis Network [SAHN] was founded on April 20, 2012. SAHN is a modern non-profit, non-affiliated, independent and democratic organisation established as a professional resource for all Hypnosis Professionals (Hypnotists and Hypnotherapists) in South Africa. SAHN was founded by Leo Gopal, a South African Hypnosis Trainer and Practitioner.

In 2012, SAHN created the first Hypnosis Census for South African Hypnosis Professionals in order to get a clear understanding of the current state of the hypnosis profession in South Africa. SAHN has also created legal resources which are freely available for Hypnotherapists regarding the legalities of Hypnosis Practice in South Africa, this and many other such resources are available in the SAHN Hypnosis Toolbox.

SAHN works closely with other organisation with similar aims, such as, The Hypnosis Guild of Southern Africa which is also a non-profit and non-aligned organisation that hosts regular premiere hypnosis events across the three major cities of South Africa.

SAHN has also created a free directory of hypnotherapists based in South Africa that is a resource for the South African public to better find a Hypnosis Professional near them.

References

External links
Official Website
New World Hypnosis & Tarot Reading

Hypnosis organizations
Medical and health organisations based in South Africa